Dobra is a small village in Jhunjhunu district of Rajasthan, India. In the 2011 census, there were 1,334 residents. It is about 50 km from Jhunjhunu and 20 km from Pilani. Gotras are Megwal (Gurawa, Badgurjar) Lamoria and Kaswan. Dadhich Brahman Smaj (Gotras Jajodia and Pahlod) are also situated here. The nearest primary health center is in Peepli. There is one government middle school and for higher education students go to a nearby city. It is well connected by road and there is plenty of water. There is also a very holy temple of Lord Hanuman named as "Rudana Dham". It has its own celestial pleasure to be felt amidst the greenery.

References

Villages in Jhunjhunu district